23, Male, Single is the debut mini album by 2PM's South Korean singer and dancer Jang Wooyoung. It was released by JYP Entertainment on July 8, 2012.

Background
The song "DJ Got Me Goin' Crazy" is composed and written by fellow 2PM member Jun. K, while "Be With You" is composed and written by Lee Junho.

The debut performance was held at the Mnet 20's Choice Awards ceremony on June 28 with "2Nite" and "Sexy Lady". The extended play was released on July 8 together with a music video for "Sexy Lady", which was presented during a fan showcase the next day. "Sexy Lady" is a dance song produced by J.Y. Park, while "Only Girl" is dedicated to fans.

Track listing
※ Bolded track title means it is the title track in the album.

Chart performances

Single charts
Sexy Lady

Album charts

References

External links
 Jang Wooyoung official website

2012 EPs
Korean-language EPs
JYP Entertainment EPs